The Flags of Hungarian history are a series of 23 flags selected from Hungarian history, spanning over 1100 years. Hungary uses them in official ceremonies.

The flags in chronological order
 Flag of the Grand Prince from the time of the Hungarian conquest of the Carpathian Basin (895) 
 Flag of King Saint Stephen of Hungary
 Flag of the Árpád dynasty: the Árpád stripes
 Flag of the Árpádian kings from the late 12th century: the double cross on three hills
 Flag of the Anjou kings of Hungary
 Flag of János Hunyadi, regent of Hungary
 Flag of the Black Army of king Matthias Corvinus
 Flag of Miklós Zrínyi
 Flag of the nobility uprising of Nyitra County from the time of the Ottoman wars
 Flag of the Hajdús of István Bocskai
 Flag of Gábor Bethlen, Prince of Transylvania
 Flag of Imre Thököly, Prince of Transylvania
 Flag of Francis II Rákóczi, Prince of Hungary and Transylvania
 Flag of the cavalry of Francis II Rákóczi
 Flag of the hussars of Baranya from the 18th century
 Flag of the Jassic-Cuman hussars from the 1770s
 Flag of the uprising nobility of Pest County from the time of the Napoleonic Wars
 Flag of the Honvéd Army in the closing months of the Hungarian Revolution of 1848
 Flag of the Royal Hungarian Landwehr from 1869
 Flag of the Royal Hungarian Army from 1938
 Flag of the Hungarian Defence Forces from 1949
 Flag of the Hungarian Revolution of 1956
 Flag of the Hungarian Defence Forces from 1990

Gallery

References

External links
 

National symbols of Hungary